Dersingham is a village and civil parish in the English county of Norfolk.

History
Dersingham's name is of Anglo-Saxon origin and derives from the Old English for the village or settlement of Deorsige's people.

In the Domesday Book, Dersingham is listed as a settlement of 115 households in the hundred of Freebridge. In 1086, the village was divided between the estates of Eudo, son of Spirewic and Peter de Valognes.

Geography
According to the 2011 Census, Dersingham has a population of 4,640 residents living in 2,394 households.

Dersingham falls within the constituency of North West Norfolk and is represented at Parliament by James Wild MP of the Conservative Party.

The nearby Dersingham Bog National Nature Reserve, managed by Natural England (formerly English Nature), contains habitats ranging from marshland to heathland and woodland. Birds such as the redpoll, crossbill, long-eared owl, tree pipit, sparrowhawk and nightjar can be found there.

St Nicholas' Church
Dersingham's parish church is of Norman origin and is dedicated to Saint Nicholas. The Church of St Nicholas is a Grade I listed building. The church holds a good example of a 14th-century chancel with stained glass depicting Jesus, Saint Agnes and Saint Luke installed by James Powell and Sons and Charles Eamer Kempe in the early 20th Century. The wooden parish chest, dating from the middle of the 14th century, is carved elaborately with the symbols of the four Evangelists; on the lid, there is part of an inscription.

Sandringham House
Sandringham House, a favoured Royal residence of Queen Elizabeth II and several of her predecessors, lies just to the south of Dersingham in the parish of Sandringham. The Queen visited Dersingham Infant School to mark her Diamond Jubilee in February 2012.

Notable residents

Sir Arthur Bryant- English historian and writer
Phil Collins- English musician and frontman of Genesis
Arthur Harry Cross - organist at Sandringham Church for 28 years
John Dolignon- Norfolk and Marylebone Cricket Club cricketer
Claire Goose- British actress
Thomas Kerrich- English clergyman, librarian and antiquarian

References

External links

 
Villages in Norfolk
Civil parishes in Norfolk
King's Lynn and West Norfolk